Buell Neidlinger (March 2, 1936 – March 16, 2018) was an American cellist and double bassist. He has worked with a variety of pop and jazz performers, prominently with iconoclastic pianist Cecil Taylor in the 1950s and '60s.

Biography 
Neidlinger was born in New York City to the former Jane Buell and Roger Nidlinger.  He was raised in Westport, Connecticut, where his father ran a cargo shipping business. He played cello in his youth, and began studying double bass after a music teacher recommended it to strengthen his hands. He took lessons from jazz bassist Walter Page. In his teens, Neidlinger suffered a nervous breakdown which he attributed to the pressure of being perceived as a child prodigy on cello. While institutionalized, he met jazz pianist Joe Sullivan who was in treatment for alcoholism.

Neidlinger dropped out of Yale University after one year, where he had been studying orchestral music.  He moved to New York City and began playing in various jazz settings. He joined Cecil Taylor's group in 1955, played with Herbie Nichols and recorded extensively with Taylor's groups with Steve Lacy and with Archie Shepp among others until 1961. He was also involved with new directions in classical music (John Cage, Mauricio Kagel, George Crumb) and Gunther Schuller' s Third Stream music.

In 1971, Neidlinger moved to California. He became the principal bassist for the Los Angeles Chamber Orchestra and was also principal bassist in the Warner Bros. studio orchestra for 30 years.  He worked extensively as an orchestral and as a session bassist before becoming a musical educator at the New England Conservatory and CalArts. Together with Marty Krystall he founded K2B2 Records. The sessions Neidlinger performed on as a strings player included Tony Bennett's "I Left My Heart In San Francisco" and the Eagles' "Hotel California".

In 1983, he performed on the Antilles Records release Swingrass '83. In 1997, Neidlinger moved to Whidbey Island, Washington State. There, he played in a band called Buellgrass, which included fiddler Richard Greene and featured their version of bluegrass music. Neidlinger's fourth wife, Margaret Storer, was also a bass player.  They played baroque music with friends; he played cello, while she played violin.

Neidlinger's final recording was The Happenings, accompanied by Howard Alden on guitar and Marty Krystall on bass clarinet and flute, released in December 2017.

Discography

As leader
 1961: New York City R&B (Barnaby) with Cecil Taylor
 1980: Ready for the 90's (K2B2 2069) as Krystall Klear and the Buells
 1981: Our Night Together (K2B2 2169) as Krystall Klear and the Buells
 1983: Big Day at Ojai (K2B2 2369) as Buellgrass
 1983: Marty's Garage (K2B2 2269)
 1987: Thelonious (K2B2 2569)
 1987: Buell Neidlinger Quartet Live at Ravenna Jazz '87 with Special Guest Steve Lacy (K2B2 3969) with Steve Lacy
 1989: 2 by 2 (K2B2 4169) with Anthony Braxton
 1989: The Complete Candid Recordings of Cecil Taylor and Buell Neidlinger (Mosaic) with Cecil Taylor
 1989: Aurora (Denon 73148) as Aurora
 1990: Big Drum (K2B2 3069)
 1991: Locomotive (Soul Note)
 1995: Blue Chopsticks – A Portrait of Herbie Nichols (K2B2 3169)
 1996: Across the Tracks (K2B2 6923)
 1997: Rear View Mirror (K2B2 2969)
 2001: Thelonious Atmosphere (K2B2 3269)
 2005: All Strung Out. Adventures in Buellgrass. (K2B2 3569)
 2005: Krystall Klear and the Buells - This Way Is West (K2B2 3369)
 2009: Basso Profundo (Vivace 8001)

As sideman
With Darol Anger
 1999: Diary of a Fiddler (Compass)

With Bee Gees
 1968: I Started A Joke (Capitol Records)

With Ruben Blades
 1988: Nothing But the Truth (Elektra)

With Anthony Braxton
 1987: Six Monk's Compositions (Black Saint)

With Natalie Cole
 1991: Unforgettable (Elektra)

With Ry Cooder
 1987: Get Rhythm (Warner Bros.)

With Stewart Copeland
 1983: Rumblefish (Original Motion Picture Soundtrack) (A&M)

With Diane Schuur
 1992: In Tribute (GPR)

With Lionel Richie
 1982: Lionel Richie (Motown)

With Elvis Costello
 1989: Spike (Warner Bros.)

With Lindsey Buckingham
 1992: Out of the Cradle (Mercury)

With Earth, Wind, and Fire
 1980: Faces (Columbia)

With Michael Bolton
 1992: Timeless: The Classics (Columbia)
 1996: This Is The Time: The Christmas Album (Columbia)

With Curtis Stigers
 1995: Time Was (Arista)

With Duane Eddy
 1987: Duane Eddy (Capitol)

With Yvonne Elliman
 1979: Yvonne (RSO)

With Neil Diamond
 1977: I'm Glad You're Here with Me Tonight (Columbia)

With Richard Greene
 1979: Ramblin (Rounder)
 1997: Sales Tax Toddle (Rebel)
 1996: Wolves A' Howlin (Rebel)With Jimmy Giuffre 1960: The Jimmy Giuffre Quartet in Person (Verve)With Kenny Rogers 1985: The Heart of the Matter (RCA)
 1994: Timepiece (143)With Clint Black 1993: No Time to Kill (RCA)
 1994: One Emotion (RCA)With David Grisman 1978: Hot Dawg (Horizon)With Leo Kottke 1986: A Shout Toward Noon (Private Music)
 1988: Regards from Chuck Pink (Private Music)With Steve Lacy 1958: Soprano Sax (Prestige)
 1959: Reflections (New Jazz)With Roy Orbison 1989: Mystery Girl (Virgin)
 1992: King of Hearts (Virgin)With Peter Allen 1976: Taught by Experts (A&M)With Jean-Luc Ponty and Frank Zappa 1970: King Kong (World Pacific)
 1976: Cantaloupe Island (Blue Note)With Van Dyke Parks 1972: Discover America (Warner Bros.)
 1989: Tokyo Rose (Warner Bros.)With Sam Phillips 1988: The Indescribable Wow (Virgin)With Bonnie Raitt 1994: Longing in Their Hearts (Capitol)With Peter Rowan 1978: Peter Rowan (Flying Fish)
 1996: Bluegrass Boy (Sugar Hill)With Bob Seger 1991: The Fire Inside (Capitol)
 1995: It's a Mystery (Capitol)With Frank Sinatra 1993: Duets (Capitol)With Pops Staples 1992: Peace to the Neighborhood (PointBlank)With Ringo Starr and Harry Nilsson'''
 1988: Stay Awake: Various Interpretations of Music from Vintage Disney Films (A&M)With Barbra Streisand 1994: Ordinary Miracles (Columbia)With Cecil Taylor 1956: Jazz Advance (Transition)
 1958: At Newport (Verve)
 1959: Looking Ahead! (Contemporary)
 1959: Love for Sale (United Artists)
 1959: In Transition (Blue Note)
 1960: The World of Cecil Taylor (Candid)
 1960: Air (Candid)
 1961: Cell Walk for Celeste (Candid)
 1961: Jumpin' Punkins (Candid)With The Beach Boys'''
 1988: Cocktail (Original Motion Picture Soundtrack)'' (Elektra)

Featured Classics
 Franz Schubert: Quintet in A op. 114 ("Trout") with Peter Serkin and Tashi (RCA ARLI1882)
 Paul Chihara: GRASS Concerto for Bass and Orchestra London Symphony Orchestra (Turnabout 34372)
 Los Angeles Chamber Orchestra with Neville Marriner (Angel 537081)
 Respighi: Ancient Airs and Dances Neville Marriner / Los Angeles Chamber Orchestra (Angel CDC - 7471162)
 Los Angeles Chamber Orchestra with Neville Marriner (Argo ZRG 792)
 Basso Profundo. Solo bass and chamber music by Bussotti, Rosenman, Kagel, Xenakis and Ceely. (Vivace Records)

References

External links
 Biography and 1983 interview
 Extensive interview from 2003
 K2B2 Discography

1936 births
2018 deaths
People from Westport, Connecticut
Third stream musicians
Avant-garde jazz musicians
American jazz double-bassists
American classical double-bassists
Male double-bassists
Candid Records artists
Jazz musicians from Connecticut
American male jazz musicians
Eli's Chosen Six members
20th-century classical musicians
20th-century American male musicians